The Darien Short Line was founded in the early 1890s to build track North out of Darien, Georgia, USA.  The railroad built some track but never connected anywhere before going bankrupt.  It was then purchased by the Darien and Western Railroad in 1894.

Defunct Georgia (U.S. state) railroads
Railway companies disestablished in 1894
American companies disestablished in 1894
1894 disestablishments in Georgia (U.S. state)